Caio Terra (born 8 February 1986) is a Brazilian Jiu Jitsu (BJJ) competitor and world champion. Caio began training Brazilian Jiu-Jitsu in 2003 and received his black belt in 2006. His promotion to black belt is one of the quickest recorded in Brazilian Jiu Jitsu history.

Career 
As Caio had not hit the time frame outlined by the federation, he was  blocked from competing at the 2007 Brazilian Nationals (Brasileiro). Later that year, and although the federation had plans to veto Caio from the World Championship, the IBJJF made a last-minute exception accepting his entry for competition. This was the last time someone with less than 1 year experience at brown belt was legally allowed to compete as a black belt in an IBJJF tournament.

Caio is known for his maxim "Technique Conquers All", an expression he has tested and proven through his successful victories in the open weight divisions. Caio Terra now trains and owns the Caio Terra Academy in San Jose, California. He also owns Caio Terra Online, an internet based instructional site where Caio and invited instructors, provide technical insight and instruction plans to subscribers and affiliate academies.

In 2017 Caio retired from No Gi competition and decided to focus his energy on his team. Since retiring Caio has helped develop Mikey Musumeci (the only four-time Black Belt American World Champion), Mason Fowler, Yuri Simoes, Rudson Telles, Jeremy Jackson, Kaniela Kahuanui and others.

The Caio Terra Academy made headlines during the coronavirus pandemic as Terra publicly revealed that his gym was threatened with $5,000 fines by local public health officials for every class he ran, forcing him to close. On 28 September 2020,  Terra was awarded with the 4th degree on his BJJ Black Belt from Master Paulo Mauricio Strauch.

Instructor lineage
Mitsuyo Maeda → Carlos Gracie → Reyson Gracie → Paulo Maurício Strauch → Caio Terra

Career highlights 

 IBJJF World Champion 2008/2013
 IBJJF World No Gi Champion 2008-2017 (Ten Time World No Gi Champion)
 IBJJF Pan American Champion 2011/2012/2013
 USBJJF/ IBJJF American Nationals Champion 2010*/2011**/2012
 USBJJF/ IBJJF American Nationals No Gi Champion 2012*
 IBJJF European Open Champion 2014/2015/2016/2017/2018
 IBJJF European No Gi Open Champion 2013**
 IBJJF Las Vegas Open Champion 2010**/2011**/2012
 UKBJJF/IBJJF British National Champion 2015**
 UKBJJF/IBJJF British National No Gi Champion 2015**
 IBJJF World Championship Runner-Up 2009-2011, 2017 
 USBJJF/IBJJF American National Championship Runner-Up 2010/2012/2014
 Metamoris 1 Super fight winner
 FTW Bantamweight GI and No Gi Title Holder

*Absolute **Weight and Absolute

Personal life 
His father is the Brazilian singer Renato Terra.

See also 
 World Jiu-Jitsu Championship
 World Nogi Brazilian Jiu-Jitsu Championship
 Pan-American Championship
 Pan Jiu-Jitsu No-Gi Championship
 European Brazilian Jiu-Jitsu Championship
 European Nogi Brazilian Jiu Jitsu Championship

References

External links
 
 Caio Terra   career on  Martial Arts Ranking

Brazilian practitioners of Brazilian jiu-jitsu
People awarded a black belt in Brazilian jiu-jitsu
Living people
1986 births
World No-Gi Brazilian Jiu-Jitsu Championship medalists
Sportspeople from Rio de Janeiro (city)